Alice Alldredge is an American oceanographer and marine biologist who studies marine snow, carbon cycling, microbes and plankton in the ecology of the ocean. She has conducted research in the open sea, at her laboratory at the University of California, Santa Barbara as well as in collaboration with the Long Term Ecological Research Network (LTER) at the Mo'orea Coral Reef Long Term Ecological Research Site (MCR LTER) in Mo'orea, French Polynesia. According to the annual ISI Web of Knowledge list published by Thomson Reuters, she has been one of the most cited scientific researchers since 2003.

Biography
Alice Louise Alldredge was born in 1949 in Denver, Colorado, USA, graduated from Merrit Hutton High School in Thornton, Colorado, and completed an undergraduate degree in biology at Carleton College in 1971. Her father was an inspiration to her interest in science and her mother was a role-model as well. She continued her education to earn a PhD in 1975 from the University of California, Davis. Between 1975 and 1976, she studied at the Australian Institute of Marine Science as a NATO Postdoctoral Fellow.

She joined the faculty of the University of California, Santa Barbara in 1976 and has conducted research on ocean ecology. She discovered the existence of abundant gel particles called Transparent Exopolymer
Particles (TEP) and  demersal zooplankton, describing their migration and dispersion throughout coral reefs, seagrass meadows, and tidal sandflats. She is an authority on marine snow, the particles which settle to the bottom of the oceans, and the cycling in the sea of carbon.  Through her work on marine snow, Alldredge changed the understanding of particle flux and she made the first quantification of observed sinking rates of marine snow, "showing that marine snow sinks rapidly enough to deliver significant amounts of organic carbon to the deep [sea]".

In addition to her teaching and research at UC-Santa Barbara, Alldredge works at the Mo'orea Coral Reef as a researcher with the LTER Study in Mo'orea, French Polynesia studying the currents and forces effecting water transport of the island. In addition to evaluating the biological effect of zooplankton and fish on the reef, scientists are evaluating the biochemical characteristics and  differences between waters over the reef and offshore waters. Alldredge has been credited for her role in UC-Santa Barbara's ranking as 7th best university worldwide based on its global scientific impact and collaboration record. She is in the top 0.1% of the ISI Web of Knowledge's highly cited researchers and has remained there since 2003.

In 1990, Alldredge was elected as a Fellow of the American Association for the Advancement of Science, in 1992 she won the Henry Bryant Bigelow Medal from the Woods Hole Oceanographic Institution, and in 1995, she was awarded the first chair of UC-Santa Barbara's graduate program in Marine Science, which she held until 2004 and was awarded $5,000. In 1996, she was honored with a Distinguished Teaching Award for Sciences from UC-Santa Barbara, and in 1998 was selected as a Fellow of the American Geophysical Union.

Alldredge became the chair of the Department of Ecology, Evolution, and Marine Biology at UC-Santa Barbara in 2004. In 2008, she was awarded the G. Evelyn Hutchinson Award from the American Society of Limnology and Oceanography and in 2011 received the Alumni Association Distinguished Achievement Award from Carleton College.

References

External links
 WorldCat Publications list

American marine biologists
American oceanographers
1949 births
Living people
20th-century American women scientists
21st-century American women scientists
Carleton University alumni
Fellows of the American Association for the Advancement of Science
Fellows of the American Geophysical Union
University of California, Davis alumni
University of California, Santa Barbara faculty
20th-century American scientists
21st-century American scientists